"The Hukilau Song" is a song written by Jack Owens in 1948 after attending a luau in Laie, Hawaii.

Covers
The song has been recorded many times by a variety of artists.

Alfred Apaka
Ab Orchestra
Ray Conniff
Bing Crosby — Return to Paradise Islands (1963)
Book 'em Danno 
Cruis'n Peidl
Disney Sing-Along Songs
Josh Dobrin and The All Saints Gangsters   
Nate Gibson and the Gashouse Gang
The Hit Crew 
Don Ho
Big Kahuna and the Copa Cat Pack
Big Pineapple
Webley Edwards
Annette Funicello
Amy Gilliom & Willie K
Hawaiian Escape 
George Kahumoku, Jr.
Gerrit & de Kokosnoten
Lester Lanin 
Sam Makia
Marcy Marxer
The Mauna Loa Islanders
New Hawaiian Band 
Mel Peterson 
Tiny Tim
Ukulele Magic

In popular culture
The song was featured in the American television show South Park in the episode "Do the Handicapped Go to Hell?"
The song was featured in the American television show  Hey Arnold! in the episode "Casa Paradiso"
The song inspired a line in the Sublime song "Freeway Time in LA County Jail" which reads "And I'm back on the reef/where I throw my net out into the sea/all the fine hinas come swimming to me"
Alf sang the chorus in the episode “It’s My Party” (Season 4, Episode 14) of ALF (TV series)

See also
Hukilau

Footnotes

External links

 Lyrics at www.huapala.org
 Ali'i Luau & La'ie Hukilau - a commentary on the connection between the Hukilau Song and the Polynesian Cultural Center

1948 songs
Hawaiian music
Songs written by Jack Owens (singer-songwriter)